Tannirbhavi beach is a beach in Mangalore, Karnataka, India. It is one of the most popular tourist destinations in coastal Karnataka. Along with the beach, Sultan Battery, Tannirbavi Tree Park & the proposed Marine museum are also the tourist attractions. It can be reached either by land near Kuloor Bridge or by ferry via Gurupura river from Sultan Battery.

Tannirbhavi (also spelled as Tannirbavi) is one of the popular beaches in Mangalore city, and comes second in popularity next to Panambur beach. Tannirbhavi beach has some basic facilities like lifeguards, proper toilets, a parking lot, a couple of small eateries and concrete benches.

On the other side of the land strip of the beach there is a barge-mounted 220 MW power plant set up by the GMR Group. It is located at a distance of 12 km from Mangalore.

Tannirbhavi Tree Park 
Tannirbhavi Tree Park is set up in an area of 15 hectares near Tannirbhavi Beach. It is an initiate by Karnataka Forest Department. The Tree Park includes tree species found in the Western Ghats and also the trees/plants are herbal and have medical importance. It has various sculptures depicting the culture of the region — Tulu Nadu such as Yakshagana and Buta Kola.

Connectivity 

Tannirbhavi is well connected by road, and easily reachable by own vehicle or a hired one. Alternatively, you can take city bus (No. 16, 16A) from Statebank to Sultan Battery  and take a Ferry ride across Gurupur river. After crossing the river with the ferry, you can find a way between trees and reach the beach.

References

External links

 http://www.bookmytrip.in/cities/mangalore.htm
 Tannirbhavi Beach on Karnataka Government official Website

Beaches of Mangalore